Oshino Hakkai (literally Eight Seas in Oshino) are the eight springs found in Oshino, Yamanashi, Japan. The aquifer water from Mount Fuji comes out to the ground to form these springs. They are a Natural monument of Japan, part of the Mount Fuji World Heritage Site, and one of Yamanashi Prefecture's important tourist attractions.

Gallery 
The traditional eight springs are called:

See also
Fuji Five Lakes
Fuji-Hakone-Izu National Park

References

External link

Oshino Hakkai (Official site of Oshino Village, in Japanese)

Springs of Japan
Natural monuments of Japan
Tourist attractions in Yamanashi Prefecture